Spicara is a genus of picarels native to the eastern Atlantic Ocean and the western Indian Ocean.

Species
There are currently eight recognized species in this genus:
 Spicara alta (Osório, 1917) (Bigeye picarel)
 Spicara australis (Regan, 1921)
 Spicara axillaris (Boulenger, 1900)
 Spicara flexuosa  (Rafinesque, 1810)
 Spicara maena (Linnaeus, 1758) (Blotched picarel)
 Spicara martinicus (Valenciennes, 1830)
 Spicara melanurus (Valenciennes, 1830) (Blackspot picarel)
 Spicara nigricauda (Norman, 1931) (Blacktail picarel)
 Spicara smaris (Linnaeus, 1758) (Picarel)

References

Sparidae
Marine fish genera
Taxa named by Constantine Samuel Rafinesque